Sean Six is an American actor who started acting at the age of 8. His first role was in the theater, in a production of Fiddler on the Roof at the San Francisco Civic Auditorium. He is best known for his role as the Tenctonese teenager, Buck Francisco, in the cult science fiction TV series Alien Nation.

Sean landed this role after video of him acting in a play he co-wrote with a friend was viewed by producers of the Alien Nation series.

Sean reprised this role in all five Alien Nation TV movies after the cancellation of the series. In addition he appeared in "Blood Relatives," a first season episode of the series Millennium.

Filmography

Television

External links
 

American male television actors
Year of birth missing (living people)
Living people
American male child actors
Place of birth missing (living people)